Khargineh-ye Kuik-e Shekar (also Romanized as Khargīneh-ye Kū’īk-e Shekar; also known as Kū’īk and Kū’īk-e Shekar) is a village in Howmeh-ye Sarpol Rural District, in the Central District of Sarpol-e Zahab County, Kermanshah Province, Iran. At the 2006 census, its population was 1,136, with 259 families.

References 

Populated places in Sarpol-e Zahab County